Amanpreet Singh Randhawa (born 2 May 1990) is an Indian professional wrestler currently signed to Impact Wrestling and Ohio Valley Wrestling where he performs under the ring name Mahabali Shera or simply Shera. He also had a brief stint under contract with WWE in 2018.

Professional wrestling career

Total Nonstop Action Wrestling / Impact Wrestling

Ring Ka King (2011–2012) 
In December 2011, under the ring name Mahabali Veera, he took part in the India project Ring Ka King, backed by Total Nonstop Action Wrestling (TNA). He competed in the RKK World Heavyweight Championship tournament to crown the inaugural champion, and he defeated Dr. Nicholas Dinsmore in the quarterfinals of the tournament before being defeated by Scott Steiner in the semifinals. During the final week of tapings, on 21 April 2012, Veera defeated Sir Brutus Magnus to become the final RKK World Heavyweight Champion.

The Revolution (2014–2015) 

On 22 September 2014, it was announced that he would debut in the following weeks. On 12 November episode of Impact Wrestling, Manik attempted to introduce him to the leader of The Revolution stable, James Storm, before Storm demanded Manik to send Shera away. On 7 January 2015, his ring name changed to Khoya, officially joining The Revolution. On 23 January episode of Impact Wrestling, Khoya made his in-ring debut, defeating Tigre Uno. On 10 April, Khoya defeated Manik and Abyss in a 3-Way match to join James Storm in a qualifier match to participate in the 4-Way Tag Team Ultimate X Match for the vacant TNA World Tag Team Championship in a losing effort.

On 26 June episode of Impact Wrestling, Khoya turned face after being beaten and repeatedly insulted by James Storm, and entered in a feud with Storm. On 5 August episode of Impact Wrestling, he stood up to Storm, hit him with a sitout spinebuster and officially changing his name to Mahabali Shera. On the 30 September episode of Impact Wrestling, Shera defeated Storm in a no disqualification match, ending their feud.

Various feuds (2015–2017) 
On 4 October, at Bound For Glory, Shera competed in a 12-man Bound for Gold gauntlet match but was eliminated by Tyrus who went on to win the match. He then entered in the TNA World Title Series as a member in the Group Wild Card along with Crazzy Steve, Kenny King, and Aiden O'Shea for the vacated TNA World Heavyweight Championship. He ended first of his block when he became victorious in receiving nine points, thus advancing to the round of 16 where he defeated Eli Drake in the first round match. On the 9 December episode of Impact Wrestling, Shera lost to Lashley in the quarterfinals, failing to advance the round of four and being eliminated.

On 16 February 2016 episode of Impact Wrestling, Shera formed a new tag team Grado. On 29 March episode of Impact Wrestling, he was taken out by Al Snow who attacked Grado and broke his arm. On 12 April episode of Impact Wrestling, Shera and Snow had a harsh conversation in which Snow apologized to Shera and shook his hand. However, after Shera was getting out of the ring, Snow assaulted Shera from behind, leaving him lying near the steel steps. A week later, Shera lost to Snow after receiving a knuckle to the head. In his rematch against Snow on 10 May episode of Impact Wrestling, Grado came back and distracted Snow, allowing Shera to win.

In May 2017, Shera became involved in a storyline between Braxton Sutter and Kongo Kong. He saved Sutter and Allie from Kong, KM, Sienna, and Laurel Van Ness on the 18 May episode of Impact Wrestling. On 15 June episode of Impact Wrestling, Shera won a gauntlet match for the inaugural Sony SIX Invitational Trophy, last eliminating KM. At Slammiversary on 2 July, Shera teamed with Sutter and Allie to defeat KM, Kong and Van Ness in a six-person tag team match. His last match was on 11 November episode of Xplosion, where he defeated Caleb Konley. On 13 November 2017, his profile was officially removed from Impact Wrestling's website, confirming his departure from the company. According to Pro Wrestling Insider, Randhawa had quietly left the company about two months earlier.

WWE (2018) 
On 14 February 2018, Randhawa signed a contract with WWE, and subsequently reported to the WWE Performance Center. At a NXT live event on 1 March in Ocala, Florida, he made his debut with a win over Dan Matha. In September 2018, he was released from his WWE contract.

Return to Impact Wrestling (2019–present) 
On 21 April 2019, it was announced that Randhawa had re-signed with Impact Wrestling following his release from WWE. Shera would make his return during the Impact tapings in Mexico at the end of a match between Desi Hit Squad members Rohit Raju and Raj Singh and Big Mami and Nino Hamburguesa, destroying the Deaners and affirming his loyalty to Gama Singh and the Desi Hit Squad, turning heel. Desi Hit Squad  quietly disbanded after their 8 February loss to The Rascalz.

After a lengthy hiatus, Shera returned to Impact television when he aided former Desi Hit Squad stablemate Rohit Raju in a beatdown on Raju's rival and Impact X Division Champion TJP. On 17 July 2021, Shera teamed with Madman Fulton at Slammiversary in a losing effort against FinJuice.

On 23 September 2021, it was reported that Mahabali Shera was going to be out of action after reportedly dealing with an unknown injury.

Ohio Valley Wrestling (2019–present) 
On 22 October 2019, Shera made his Ohio Valley Wrestling debut, where he was defeated by Drew Hernandez in a dark match. On 10 December 2019, at OVW Christmas Choas Shera teamed with Jax Dane, Dimes and Corey Storm in an eight man steel cage tag team match against The Legacy Of Brutality (Big Zo, Cash Flo, Hy-Zaya and Jay Bradley) in a losing effort. On 6 January 2020, on the first episode of OVW Overdrive, Shera faced Jay Bradley in a losing effort.

On 9 January 2021, Shera returned competing in the 2021 Nightmare Rumble for the OVW Heavyweight Championship which was won by Omar Amir.

On 15 January 2022, Shera made his return from injury to compete in the Nightmare Rumble for a chance to earn a OVW Heavyweight Championship match. On 5 March, Shera defeated Jessie Godderz at OVW March Mayhem to become the new OVW National Heavyweight Champion.

Filmography

Television

Personal life 
Randhawa is a big fan of Bollywood and Amitabh Bachchan is his favorite actor from the industry. He belongs to the Sikh community.

Championships and accomplishments 
Ohio Valley Wrestling
OVW Heavyweight Championship (1 time, current)
OVW National Heavyweight Championship (2 times)
Pro Wrestling All-Stars of Detroit
PWASD Heavyweight Championship (1 time)
Pro Wrestling Illustrated
PWI ranked him #138 of the top 500 singles wrestlers in the PWI 500 in 2012
Ring Ka King
RKK World Heavyweight Championship (1 time)
Slam Wrestling
Slam Wrestling Heavyweight Championship (1 time)
Total Nonstop Action Wrestling / Impact Wrestling
Global Impact Tournament (2015) – with Team International 
Sony SIX Invitational Trophy (2017)

References

External links 
 
 IMDb Profile
IMPACT profile

1990 births
21st-century professional wrestlers
Indian male professional wrestlers
 Professional wrestling in India
Living people
Expatriate professional wrestlers
OVW Heavyweight Champions
OVW National Heavyweight Champions 
Indian professional wrestlers